The 2002 FIA GT Brno 500 km was the third round the 2002 FIA GT Championship season.  It took place at the Brno Circuit, Czech Republic, on 19 May 2002.

Official results
Class winners in bold.  Cars failing to complete 70% of winner's distance marked as Not Classified (NC).

Statistics
 Pole position – #23 BMS Scuderia Italia – 1:58.501
 Fastest lap – #23 BMS Scuderia Italia – 2:00.028
 Average speed – 151.790 km/h

References

 
 
 

B
FIA GT